Jessore Road is a road connecting Shyambazar through Dum Dum, both neighbourhoods in Kolkata, India, to Jessore in Bangladesh. While the Dum Dum-Barasat sector is now part of NH 12, the Barasat-Petrapole sector is now part of NH 112. It continues in Bangladesh as N706 from Benapole to Jessore. The road acts as a major link between places in and around Kolkata, especially Netaji Subhash Chandra Bose International Airport and Barasat. The road meets commuter (suburban) rail link at Barasat Junction railway station. Metro stations on this road include Shyambazar and Belgachia.

Several locations lie between Patipukur and Barasat on Jessore Road such as Patipukur Railway Station, Lake Town, Bangur Avenue, Dum Dum Park,  Nagerbazar, Birati, Madhyamgram, Barasat etc.

According to legend, the road was made by Kai Prasad Poddar, a landlord in Jessore. For building the massive road, the HM Government awarded him the title of "Chowdhury" .

Poem
Allen Ginsberg wrote a poem "September on Jessore Road" after visiting refugee camps in 1971:

Millions of babies watching the skies
Bellies swollen, with big round eyes
On Jessore Road—long bamboo huts...

References

External links

Roads in Kolkata
Roads in Bangladesh